Daugavpils Station is the main railway station serving the city of Daugavpils in south -eastern Latvia.

The station is an important railway junction, which is the terminus of the Riga–Daugavpils and Daugavpils–Indra railway lines. Riga – Minsk trains transit the station and there is a direct service to Vilnius.

Daugavpils Satiksme provides bus and tram routes including the station.

Gallery

References

External links 
 

Daugavpils
Railway stations in Latvia
Railway stations opened in 1861
Latgale